is a multi-purpose athletic stadium in Yamato, Kanagawa, Japan.

External links

Football venues in Japan
Sports venues in Kanagawa Prefecture
Yamato, Kanagawa
1990 establishments in Japan
Sports venues completed in 1990
YSCC Yokohama